Baptiste Geiler (born 12 March 1987) is a former French male volleyball player. He was part of the France men's national volleyball team. On club level he played for Friedrichshafen.

References

External links
 profile at FIVB.org
 

1987 births
Living people
Sportspeople from Montpellier
French men's volleyball players
Place of birth missing (living people)
Mediterranean Games bronze medalists for France
Competitors at the 2013 Mediterranean Games
Volleyball players at the 2015 European Games
European Games competitors for France
French expatriate sportspeople in Germany
Mediterranean Games medalists in volleyball
20th-century French people
21st-century French people